The flag of Chelyabinsk Oblast was adopted on 27 December 2001.

The flag consists of a rectangle with width-length ratio of 2:3 with a red background. At the bottom there is a yellow stripe that is equal to 1/6 of the total width, this strip is located at a distance of 1/6 of the total width from the lower edge. In the middle of the flag there is the image of a Bactrian camel with a yellow stripe that represents the Ural Mountains.

References

Flags of Russia
Chelyabinsk Oblast
Flag
Flags displaying animals